Welcome is an unincorporated community in Coweta County, in the U.S. state of Georgia.

History
A post office called Welcome was established in 1891, and remained in operation until 1901. Some say the community was named after Welcome Carter, a pioneer settler, while others believe the community was named for the fact the Indians were welcoming to the first settlers.

References

Unincorporated communities in Georgia (U.S. state)
Unincorporated communities in Coweta County, Georgia